Sandokan the Great is a 1963 Italian adventure film, directed by Umberto Lenzi and starring Steve Reeves. It is the first entry in a film series about Sandokan, the pirate-prince from Emilio Salgari's popular swashbuckler novels.

Plot
During the reign of Queen Victoria, British forces led by Lord Hillock occupy Tapuah, subduing its population through mass murder. Among their victims are the mother and brothers of Sandokan, and he in reprisal organizes a revolutionary band. When Hillock attempts to entrap the rebel by threatening to hang his father, the Sultan of Mulaker, Sandokan penetrates Hillock's home, taking as hostage the Englishman's niece, Mary Ann. Although initially indignant, Mary Ann comes to love her captor. Following an encounter with headhunters, Sandokan and his men are surrounded by Hillock's forces, and an armistice is negotiated according to which Sandokan and his gang will be exiled in return for Mary Ann's release.

Hillock immediately violates the agreement, however, imprisoning the rebels and planning for their immediate execution. Escaping, the insurgents, joined by Mary Ann, combine with the army of the native chieftain Tuang Olong to free their homeland from British domination.  Hillock is allowed to leave unharmed (the officers directly responsible for the deaths of Sandokan's family members are killed in the final battle).  To the horror of her uncle, Mary Ann opts to remain with Sandokan and be his bride.

Cast
 Steve Reeves as Sandokan
 Geneviève Grad as Mary Ann
 Andrea Bosic as Yanez
 Rik Battaglia as Sambigliong
 Mario Valdemarin as Tenente Ross
 Leo Anchóriz as Lord Guillonk
 Antonio Molino Rojo as Tenente Toymby
 Enzo Fiermonte as Sergente Mitchell
 Nazzareno Zamperla as Hirangu

Production
Giovanni Cianfriglia was the stunt double for Steve Reeves. The film's exterior scenes were filmed in Spain.

Release
Sandokan the Great opened in Italy in December 1963 under the title of Sandokan, la tigre di Mompracem (Sandokan, the Tiger of Mompracem) at 115 minutes, in Madrid in March 1964 under the title of Sandokan, and later in Paris in December 1964 as Sandokan, le tigre de Bornéo (Sandokan, the Tiger of Borneo). It was released in the USA in 1965 as Sandokan the Great.

Reception
In a contemporary review, the Monthly Film Bulletin reviewed a dubbed 89 minute version of the film. The review referred to the film as "sagily and fairly stodgily directed by Umberto Lenzi" with an "adequate but anonymous performance by Steve Reeves". The review concluded that the film was "fine for anyone particularly partial to children's adventure stories. The scenes in the swamp and jungle are pleasingly photographed in authentic story-book colours."

References

Footnotes

Sources

External links

1963 films
1960s historical adventure films
Films directed by Umberto Lenzi
Films based on the Indo-Malaysian cycle
Films set in Malaysia
Films set in the 19th century
Italian historical adventure films
French historical adventure films
Films scored by Giovanni Fusco
Spanish historical adventure films
Films shot in Sri Lanka
1960s Italian-language films
1960s Italian films
1960s French films